Saturn in Ascension is the fourth full-length album released by the band Saturnus. It was released on 30 November 2012.

Track listing
 "Litany of Rain" 10:33 	 
 "Wind Torn" 09:14 
 "A Lonely Passage" 05:30 	
 "A Fathers Providence" 05:09 	  
 "Mourning Sun" 10:37 	
 "Call of the Raven Moon" 07:37 	
 "Forest of Insomnia" 10:21 	
 "Between" 11:01

References

2012 albums
Saturnus (band) albums
Albums produced by Flemming Rasmussen

da:Saturn in Ascension